Atyashevo (Ätäs) is a rural locality (a selo) in Balyklinsky Selsoviet, Fyodorovsky District, Bashkortostan, Russia. The population was 290 as of 2010. There are 8 streets.

Geography 
Atyashevo is located 23 km southeast of Fyodorovka (the district's administrative centre) by road. Veselovka and Balykly are the nearest rural localities.

References 

Rural localities in Fyodorovsky District